Charles Brown's saw mill was the first saw mill in San Mateo County, California.  It was built in 1847, in the style as Sutter's Mill at Coloma, California.

References

Sawmills in the United States
+Landmarks  
List of California Historical Landmarks
C01